Constantine Nicholas "Gus" Keriazakos (July 28, 1931 – May 4, 1996) was an American professional baseball player.

Keriazakos, a native of West Orange, New Jersey, spent the entire 1954 campaign with Washington, appearing in 22 games, 19 in relief, and posting a creditable earned run average of 3.77.  He started three times, and pitched complete games in two of them.

All told, he appeared in 28 MLB games and allowed 81 hits and 42 bases on balls with 42 strikeouts in 73⅔ innings of work.

See also
 Chicago White Sox all-time roster

External links
 Baseball Reference

1931 births
1996 deaths
American people of Greek descent
Baseball players from New Jersey
Buffalo Bisons (minor league) players
Charleston Senators players
Chicago White Sox players
Colorado Springs Sky Sox (WL) players
Columbia Gems players
Columbus Jets players
Kansas City Athletics players
Major League Baseball pitchers
Memphis Chickasaws players
People from West Orange, New Jersey
Savannah A's players
Seattle Rainiers players
Sportspeople from Essex County, New Jersey
Washington Senators (1901–1960) players
Waterloo White Hawks players